Nicha Yontararak (born ), better known by her nickname and stage name Minnie, is a Thai singer, songwriter, and actress based in South Korea. She is a member of South Korean girl group (G)I-dle, which debuted on May 2, 2018 under Cube Entertainment.

Life and career

1997–2017: Early life and pre-debut
Minnie was born on October 23, 1997, in Bangkok, Thailand. She has older twin brothers. She was born into a musical family, with her mother, aunt and uncle playing the piano. Minnie has been playing piano since she was five and taking vocal lessons since she was seven years old. Her mom was her main influence for loving music. She always watched her mom playing the piano, and learned to play it from her. Minnie attended Wattana Wittaya Academy and studied music at Grammy Vocal Studio in Thailand. She was a cheerleader, drummer, actress in a stage play, and more in her school. She also studied Chinese for four years. In September 2014, she participated in the Cube Star World Audition in Thailand and came to South Korea in 2015 after her mother encouraged her, calling it a "once in a life opportunity".

On March 23, 2016, Minnie was revealed to the public through Cube Entertainment's official Instagram. On November 5, she was featured in Jeon So-yeon's performance stage at Unpretty Rapstar 3 concert. In June 2017, she participated in a promotional video for Rising Star Cosmetics along with Song Yuqi and Shuhua, future members of (G)I-dle. The same year, Minnie was given an opportunity to feature for Line Friends' "Twinkle Twinkle Little Star" and six songs in Dance Party! – Children's English Songs.

2018–2019: Debut with (G)I-dle and collaborations

On May 2, 2018, Minnie debuted with (G)I-dle with their mini-album I Am and the title song "Latata". She received positive reviews for having a unique, attractive, and soothing voice.

In their second album, I Made, Minnie participated in composing, songwriting, and arranging Blow Your Mind which was first released through To Neverland. A self-directed music video was released. Minnie confessed that she makes songs on piano and is taking MIDI classes to improve composing. She was credited in composing "For You" for (G)I-dle's Japanese debut album, Latata. In October 2019, (G)I-dle took part in Queendom by Mnet. In the first preliminary stage, the viewers were overwhelmed with Minnie's Thai intro enchantment for "Latata", and was well received from viewers in South Korea and Thailand. In the third pre-contest unit stage, Minnie represents (G)I-dle's vocal member. She shared the stage with AOA's Hyejeong performing "Instagram" by Dean. The stage was voted the most anticipated unit stage by the contestants. Moreover, the song re-entered music charts and grew popularity amongst the general public due to their performance. On October 15, it was announced that Minnie teamed up with Wengie, a Chinese Australian YouTuber for a collaboration song "Empire" on October 18. "Empire" debuted at number 22 on the Billboard World Digital Songs.

2020–present: Acting debut and solo activities

In 2020, Minnie participated in writing and composing "I'm the Trend" and "Tung-Tung (Empty)" alongside FCM Houdini. "I'm the Trend" is a song dedicated for Neverland and was unveiled during her group's first online concert I-Land: Who Am I on July 5, 2020. "Tung-Tung (Empty)" is an emotional song that expresses the feeling of a tired heart which was once full but became empty. Through Minnie's words, "I hope that many people will sympathize with this song because it conveys loneliness." The song was released for (G)I-dle's Japanese second extended play Oh My God.

In September, Minnie made her acting debut in a Netflix's sitcom So Not Worth It alongside Park Se-wan, Shin Hyun Seung, Got7's Youngjae and Han Hyun-min. The show centers on multinational students living their lives together in a dorm in Seoul. Minnie plays a fictionalized version of herself, a genre savvy Thai girl who loves Korean dramas.

In October, Minnie sung "Getaway" as part of My Dangerous Wife soundtrack  and "We Already Fell In Love" together with Miyeon as part of Do Do Sol Sol La La Sol  soundtrack  On October 6, Glance TV introduced their new fashion show Minnie Soojin's i'M THE TREND  and paired Minnie and Soojin together. The duo had a styling battle every time for the title of 'Trend Center', which is a combination of a trend setter and an idol center. In addition, the duo revealed their styling secrets, various outfits, shopping tips and video pictorial 'Fashion Film'. The show premiered on October 14 through Naver Style TV. On November 22, Minnie appeared on Play Seoul, a program produced by the Seoul Tourism Foundation and KBS where influential K-stars can share with global fans their experiences in Seoul in real-time. The show aims to promote safe post-COVID-19 tourism in Seoul. Minnie alongside Yuqi introduced the hip alley ways in Seoul by visiting Euljiro and Itaewon for their cafes and restaurants.

In 2021, Minnie co-composed "Moon" and "Dahlia", which was released on January 11 for her group's fourth extended play I Burn. The song features lyrics about love that can't be exchanged with money or any other materials. It was released as a digital single on music streaming app Joox.

Personal life
Minnie is multilingual. She speaks several languages including Thai, English, Korean, Japanese and Mandarin.

Other ventures

Endorsements 
Before Minnie's debut, she became a model for the local skin care line Celeb's Secret alongside bandmates Yuqi and Shuhua. 

In July 2022, Webtoon Thailand selected Minnie as their model to promote their new campaign, where Minnie picked three new stories to promote. It was later reported that the three titles were ranked at the top of the platform, and had the high sales revenue at the time, as well as reaching over 50 million views on the video of the campaign in spin of seven days. On the same month, Minnie was announced as MAC's new muse.

In August 2022, Minnie was announced as the muse for the South Korean clothing brand Laura Laura. In September 2022, clothing brand ACBF selected Minnie alongside band member Yuqi as their new models. In November 2022, Minnie was announced as mode for the Italian clothing brand Duvetica. In December of the same year, Minnie was one of the celebrities who advertised for the traveling platform How About Here and its partner at the time, Melon. Followed with her advertisement for the South Korean cosmetics brand 3CE.

Minnie landed her first solo magazine cover for L'Officiel'''s Thailand June 2021 edition. Since then she has been on the cover of Sudsapda, Vogue, Harper's Bazaar, and Elle.  She also appeared in an advertisement for Nespresso and Chiara Ferragni's limited edition coffee drink.

 Philanthropy 
In February, 2023, Minnie donated 20 million won to help 2023 Turkey–Syria earthquake, by donating money through Hope Bridge National Disaster Relief Association.

 Artistry 

 Musical style 
Journalist Jake Lau of South China Morning Post, noted that Minnie has a versatile voice: "she sings in a soft, breathy voice when performing more emotive songs and acoustic renditions [...] But on more powerful songs such as Lion, Minnie can belt out the powerful high notes". Apart from her voice, she is also known for her striking eyes and strong gaze that is featured in many of (G)I-dle's music videos.

 Influences 
Growing up in a family of musicians, Minnie stated that the music video of "A Thousand Miles" by Vanessa Carlton where she starts playing the song while the piano was moving, ignited her dreams as a musician. She commented, "Ever since I saw that MV, [...] I started thinking that I will sing and play the piano. I must become an artist like that". She also cites Super Junior whose songs she often sang to while growing up that led her into K-Pop. Through a magazine interview, Minnie considered American singer Alicia Keys as her role model since her childhood. She explained that she used to watch a lot of television with her mother when she was a child, and the performance by Keys’ 2003 hit "If I Ain't Got You" was what inspired her to pursue music. She also cited Australian singer Troye Sivan, Thai singer Stamp Apiwat, and American singer Charlotte Lawrence as her inspirations and hopes to collaborate with them someday.

 Songwriting 
Through an interview with HelloAsia'', she revealed that she gets inspired by her own story or from other people's stories or movies.

Discography

Singles

Other songs

Music videos

Filmography

Television shows

Variety shows

Hosting

Songwriting credits
All song credits are adapted from the Korea Music Copyright Association's database, unless otherwise noted.

Others

Awards and nominations

Notes

References

External links

 
 

1997 births
Living people
Cube Entertainment artists
21st-century Thai women singers
Musicians from Bangkok
K-pop singers
Thai pop singers
Thai actresses
English-language singers from Thailand
Korean-language singers of Thailand

(G)I-dle members
Thai expatriates in South Korea
Minnie (singer)